Pending is a district in Kuching, Sarawak, Malaysia. Administratively, it is in the Kuching South City Council area. It is home to many local fishermen, mostly of Chinese ethnicity.

References

Kuching